Chronological list of houses, commercial buildings and other works by Bruce Goff.

1910s-1940s

1917: Percy and Evaline Elliott House, 312 E. 19th Street, Tulsa, Oklahoma
1918: Quaker Avenue House, 1401 S. Quaker Avenue, Tulsa, Oklahoma
1919: Carson Avenue House, 1639 S. Carson Avenue, Tulsa, Oklahoma
1919: Oil Operator House, 1728 S. Madison Avenue, Tulsa, Oklahoma
1919: South Yorktown Avenue House, 1732 S. Yorktown Avenue, Tulsa, Oklahoma
1921: East Nineteenth Street House, 320 E. 19th Street, Tulsa, Oklahoma
1922: G. Way House, Northeast corner of E. 31st Street and S. Peoria Avenue, Tulsa, Oklahoma (The house was significantly altered in 1983, leaving little of the original design intact)
1923: Adah Robinson Studio, 1119 S. Owasso Avenue, Tulsa, Oklahoma
1926: Boston Avenue Methodist Church, 1301 South Boston Ave., Tulsa, Oklahoma (with Adah Robinson, officially credited to Rush, Endacott and Rush), NRHP-listed
1925: South Madison Avenue House, 1712 S. Madison Avenue, Tulsa, Oklahoma
1925: Consolidated Cut Stone Office Building, 1323 East 5th Street, Tulsa, Oklahoma
1925: Hansen House, 2262 S. Troost Avenue, Tulsa, Oklahoma
1926: Day Building, 512 S. Boston Avenue, Tulsa, Oklahoma
1927: Tulsa Club, 115 E. Fifth St., Tulsa, Oklahoma
1927: Page Warehouse, 1301 South Elgin Street, Tulsa, Oklahoma (Demolished in 1977)
1928: Guaranty Laundry, 2036 E. 11th Street, Tulsa, Oklahoma
1928: Christ the King Church (interior furniture, altars, and mosaics), 1530 S. Rockford Avenue, Tulsa, Oklahoma
1929: Riverside Studio, 1381 Riverside Dr., Tulsa, Oklahoma, International Style, NRHP-listed
1929: Midwest Equitable Meter Company Warehouse, 3200 Charles Page Boulevard, Tulsa, Oklahoma
1930: Tulsa Convention Hall (Brady Hall) Alterations, 105 West Brady Street, Tulsa, Oklahoma
1930: Latham House, 221 E. 21st Street, Tulsa, Oklahoma
1938: Turzak House, Chicago, Illinois
1939: Cole House, Park Ridge, Illinois
1940: Colmorgan House, Glenview, Illinois
1940: Unseth House, Park Ridge, Illinois
1947: Bachman House, Chicago, Illinois
1941: Bartman House (also known as Triaero),  Fern Creek, Kentucky
1947: Ruth VanSickle Ford House, Aurora, Illinois
1947: Ledbetter House, 701 W. Brooks, Norman, Oklahoma, NRHP-listed
1948: Hopewell Baptist Church, 5801 NW 178th St., Edmond, Oklahoma, NRHP-listed
1949: Julius Cox House, 1300 N. Cimarron Avenue, Boise City, Oklahoma

1950s-1960s

1950: Bavinger House, 730 60th Avenue NE, Norman, Oklahoma, NRHP-listed (severely damaged in 2011, demolished in 2016)
1950: Lewis Wetzler Subdivision, Timberdell Road, Norman, Oklahoma
1950: John Keys House, 911 W Timberdell Road, Norman, Oklahoma
1951: Magyness House, 909 W Timberdell Road, Norman, Oklahoma
1952: Roger Corsaw House, 1210 Woodland Drive, Norman, Oklahoma
1954: Garvey House, Urbana, Illinois
1955: John Frank House, 1300 Luker Lane, Sapulpa, Oklahoma, NRHP-listed
1956: Joe D. Price House and Studio (also known as Shin'enKan), Starview Farm, Bartlesville, Oklahoma (destroyed by arson in 1996)
1957: C. A. Comer House, 1316 N. Creek, Dewey, Oklahoma
1957: J.O. and Mary Motsenbocker House, 2416 SE Circle Drive, Bartlesville, Oklahoma
1957: Eddie Parker House, 7507 Baxtershire, Dallas, Texas (Designed by Goff in 1957 but built by Parker without Goff after dispute in 1961.) 
1957: Donald Pollock House, 2400 NW 59th St., Oklahoma City, Oklahoma, NRHP-listed
1957: Miller Brothers Service Station, Lynn Road, Pawhuska, Oklahoma
1958: Durst House, Houston, Texas
1958: L.A. Freeman House, 6565 Park Circle Drive, Joplin, Missouri
1958: Gutman House, Gulfport, Mississippi (destroyed by fire)
1958: Harold Jones House, 3411 SE Wildwood Court, Bartlesville, Oklahoma
1958: Robert White House, 1525 SW Whiteway Court, Bartlesville, Oklahoma
1959: Russell Collins House, 3400 SE Wildwood Court, Bartlesville, Oklahoma
1959: Richard Bennett House, 2841 Silver Lake Road, Bartlesville, Oklahoma
1959: J.R. Akright House Alterations, 2412 SE Circle Drive, Bartlesville, Oklahoma
1959: Redeemer Lutheran Church Education Building, 3700 SE Woodland Road, Bartlesville, Oklahoma
1960: Gryder House, Ocean Springs, Mississippi
1961: Jame Fitchette House, 1900 SE Saturn Court, Bartlesville, Oklahoma
1961: John Quincy Adams House, 108 Fairmont Road, Vinita, Oklahoma
1962: Woodland Hills Entrance Feature, Woodland Hills Boulevard, Roland, Oklahoma
1962: The First Celestine Barby House, 114 Avenue N, Beaver, Oklahoma
1963: Play Tower, Sooner Park, Bartlesville, Oklahoma
1964: William Dace House, 409 Avenue R, Beaver, Oklahoma
1965: Duncan House, Cobden, Illinois
1965: Hyde House, Prairie Village, Kansas
1965: Nicol House, Kansas City, Missouri
1965: Searing House, Prairie Village, Kansas
1966: Jacquart House, Sublette, Kansas
1968: Mitchell House, Dodge City, Kansas

1970s-1980s

1970: Glen Harder House, Mountain Lake, Minnesota (destroyed by fire)
1972: Hollywood House, 18165/18171 Meandering Way, Flint, Texas
1974: Plunkett House, 17148 Fountain Circle, Flint, Texas
1974: Barby House, Tucson, Arizona
1975: Liberty Federal Savings Bank Mosaic Mural, 232 South Main, Stillwater, Oklahoma (Goff only did the mural; the building's architect is Tom Rodgers)
1978: Pavilion for Japanese Art at the Los Angeles County Museum of Art, Los Angeles, California
1979: Struckus House, Woodland Hills, California (One of Goff's last completed designs before his death; Bart Prince supervised its completion.)
1980: Jacob Harder House, Mountain Lake, Minnesota

References

External links 

Bruce Goff Castle BandB The Duncan House, built in 1968, now operated as a bed and breakfast.
Cimarron Heritage Center, formerly the Cox House, was designed by Goff.
Art Institute of Chicago Bruce Goff Collection
Goff in the desert (official site), Heinz Emigholz' film documenting 62 of Goff's buildings

Goff, Bruce